Claudia Mora is the dean of the Jackson School of Geosciences at the University of Texas at Austin and the John A. and Katherine G. Jackson Decanal Chair in the Geosciences.

Early life and education 
Mora attended the University of New Mexico for undergraduate studies. It was in New Mexico that her interest was sparked in the field of geosciences when Mora on a field mapping trip with her older sister. After graduation, Mora went on to complete a masters degree at Rice University. Mora completed her PhD in 1988 and received her degree from the Department of Geoscience at the University of Wisconsin - Madison focusing in stable isotope analysis.

Career 
Mora was a professor at the University of Tennessee, Knoxville, where she was the first woman to join the faculty in the department of geosciences. She then served at the Los Alamos National Laboratory as the division leader for the chemistry. In 2020, Mora was appointed as dean of the Jackson School of Geosciences and the John A. and Katherine G. Jackson Decanal Chair in the Geosciences at the University of Texas at Austin.

Mora was president of the Geological Society of America from 2016 until 2017.

Awards and honors 
In 2018 the University of Wisconsin-Madison named Mora a distinguished alumna.

Selected publications

References

External links 

Living people
Rice University alumni
University of New Mexico alumni
University of Wisconsin–Madison alumni
University of Texas at Austin faculty
Women geologists
Women chemists
Year of birth missing (living people)